Martha McCarthy is a Canadian lawyer who specializes in LGBT issues of family law. McCarthy is best known as the counsel for M. in the landmark Supreme Court of Canada case, M. v. H. which established equal rights for same-sex couples in Canada. In 2007, McCarthy received the Excellence in Family Law award from the Ontario Bar Association.

See also
 Same-sex marriage in Ontario
 Same-sex marriage in Yukon

References

External links
Official webpage for Martha McCarthy

Year of birth missing (living people)
Living people
Lawyers in Ontario
Same-sex marriage in Canada
Canadian women lawyers